Sand battery may refer to:

 An electrochemical battery with a wet sand electrolyte, first used by the British and Irish Magnetic Telegraph Company
 Thermal battery, using sand as a heat storage medium

See also
Sand (disambiguation)
Battery (disambiguation)